Cacciucco is an Italian fish stew native to the western coastal towns of Tuscany. It is especially associated with the port city of Livorno in Tuscany and the town of Viareggio north of it.

Overview
Cacciucco is a hearty stew consisting of several different types of fish and shellfish; one tradition holds that there should be five different types of fish in the soup, one for each letter c in cacciucco. A wide variety of Mediterranean fish and shellfish may be used, such as red gurnard, armored gurnard, scorpionfish (scorfano), small clams such as littleneck or manila, firm-fleshed fish such as monkfish or other whitefish, red snapper, John Dory, or grouper, mussels, shrimp, and calamari. Traditionalist chefs add a stone taken from the sea to the dish. Crabs, eels, cuttlefish, octopus, bream, mullet, or anything else caught that day might be used.

A wide variety of other ingredients are used in the broth, including various vegetables (which might include onions, tomatoes, leeks, zucchini, or yellow squash), spices (which might include garlic, aniseed, dried crushed red pepper, kosher salt, black pepper, parsley, thyme, or bay leaf) and other ingredients (which might include fish stock, tomato paste, vermouth, or wine, either white or red). There are many variants of cacciucco, varying by region and availability of ingredients.

The dish is traditionally attributed to the Near East, which might be true, as the word cacciucco comes from the Turkish kaçukli ("bits and pieces" or "odds and ends"), which reflects how the stew is made, from a variety of fish.

Pellegrino Artusi, in his classic 1891 cookbook, gave the following recipe:

For  of fish, finely chop an onion and saute it with oil, parsley, and two whole cloves of garlic. The moment the onion starts to brown, add  of chopped from tomatoes or tomato paste, and season with salt and pepper. When the tomatoes are cooked, pour in one finger of strong vinegar or two fingers of weak vinegar, diluted in a large glass of water. Let boil for a few more minutes, then discard the garlic and strain the rest of the ingredients, pressing hard against the mesh. Put the strained sauce back on the fire along with whatever fish you may have on hand, including sole, red mullet, gurnard, dogfish, mantis shrimp, and other types of fish in season, leaving the small fish whole and cutting the big ones into small pieces. Taste for seasoning; but in any case it is not a bad idea to add a little olive oil, since the amount of soffritto was quite small. When the fish is cooked, the cacciucco is usually brought to the table on two separate platters: on one you place the fish, strained from the broth, and on the other you arrange enough finger-thick slices of bread to soak up all the broth.

Similar dishes
Cacciucco is similar to other types of fish stew, such as the French bouillabaisse, Greek kakavia, Spanish zarzuela, and Portuguese caldeirada. Cioppino, another fish stew, was created by Italian-American fisherman in San Francisco, who used the local Dungeness crab in a variation of the cacciucco recipe.

See also

 List of Italian dishes
 List of stews

Notes

Italian stews
Cuisine of Tuscany
Fish stews
Mediterranean cuisine